This is a list of the extreme points of Georgia: the points that are farther north, south, east or west than any other location, as well as the highest and lowest points in the country.

Extreme coordinates

Elevation extremes 
 Highest point: Shkhara (5 201m) 
 Lowest point: Black Sea (0m)

See also 
 Extreme points of Europe
 Extreme points of Earth
 Geography of Georgia (country)

References

Lists of coordinates
Georgia
Geography of Georgia (country)